= HD 130084 =

Star in the constellation Boötes

Observation data Epoch J2000 Equinox ICRS
- Constellation: Boötes
- Right ascension: 14^{h} 45^{m} 13.71176^{s}
- Declination: +32° 47′ 18.0420″
- Apparent magnitude (V): 6.28

Characteristics
- Evolutionary stage: AGB
- Spectral type: M1III

Astrometry
Radial velocity (R_{v})	28.60±0.12 km/s
Proper motion (μ)	RA: +44.901 mas/yr Dec.: −67.791 mas/yr
Parallax (π)	4.3175±0.0363 mas
Distance	755 ± 6 ly (232 ± 2 pc)
Absolute magnitude (M_{V})	−0.67

Details
Mass	5.4 M_{☉}
Radius	48 R_{☉}
Luminosity	450 L_{☉}
Surface gravity (log g)	1.98 cgs
Temperature	3,852 K
Metallicity [Fe/H]	−0.27 dex

Other designations
- NSV 20179, SAO 64306, BD+33°2489, FK5 1384, HIP 72124, HR 5510

Database references
SIMBAD	data

HD 130084, also known as HR 5510, is a suspected variable red giant star in the constellation Boötes. Located around 755 light-years away, it shines with a luminosity approximately 450 times that of the Sun and has a surface temperature of 3,852 K.
